The Liberal Party of New York is a political party in New York. Its platform supports a standard set of socially liberal policies, including abortion rights, increased spending on education, and universal health care.

History
The Liberal Party was founded in 1944 by George Counts as an alternative to the American Labor Party (ALP) which had been formed earlier as a vehicle for leftists who supported the presidential candidacy of Franklin D. Roosevelt but were uncomfortable with the Democratic Party. Despite enjoying some electoral successes, the ALP had a schism as several avowed Marxists and communists gained influence in its organization.

Subsequently, several prominent ALP members founded the Liberal Party (LP) as a leftist yet explicitly anti-communist alternative. LP founders included David Dubinsky of the International Ladies' Garment Workers' Union, Alex Rose of the Hat, Cap and Millinery Workers, theologian Reinhold Niebuhr, and activist Ben Davidson.

In the 1944 elections, both the ALP and LP nominated Roosevelt for President, but by 1948 the two parties diverged, with the Liberals nominating Harry S. Truman and the American Labor Party nominating Progressive Party candidate Henry Wallace. Non-Marxist ALP leaders like Dean Alfange helped lead a walkout to the Liberal Party.

At their founding, the Liberal Party had conceived a plan to become a national party, with former Republican presidential candidate Wendell Willkie as its national leader and candidate for Mayor of New York City in 1945. However, Willkie's unexpected death later in 1944 left the Liberals without any truly national figures to lead the party.

The Liberal Party was one of several minor parties that fulfill a role almost unique to New York State politics. New York law allows electoral fusion – a candidate can be the nominee of multiple parties and aggregate the votes received on all the different ballot lines. Several other states allow fusion, but only in New York is it commonly practiced. In fact, since each party is listed with its own line on New York ballots, multiple nominations mean that a candidate's name can be listed several times on the ballot.

The Liberal Party's primary electoral strategy was rarely to run their own candidates. Rather, they generally cross-endorsed the nominees of other parties who agreed with key elements of the LP philosophy. By supporting agreeable candidates and threatening not to support disagreeable ones, the Liberal Party hoped to influence candidate selection by the major parties.  Other currently active parties pursuing a similar strategy in New York include the Conservative Party and the Working Families Party.

In 1960, the Liberal Party endorsed John F. Kennedy for president. On September 14, 1960 he accepted the nomination, giving almost a 20-minute speech defending American Liberalism and his campaign. Here he also gave a famous quote about liberalism, stating "I'm proud to say I'm a Liberal."

While the Liberal Party generally endorsed Democratic candidates, this was not always the case. They occasionally supported Republicans such as John Lindsay and Rudy Giuliani for mayor of New York City, and Jacob Javits and Charles Goodell for U.S. Senator, and independents such as John B. Anderson (a former Republican) for President. The Liberal Party endorsed Anderson for president in 1980 instead of incumbent Democratic president, Jimmy Carter. Carter had been the Liberal candidate in 1976 even though many people considered the evangelical southerner Carter to be less liberal than his moderate northern Republican challenger, Gerald Ford.

In 1969, Lindsay, the incumbent Republican Mayor of New York City, lost his own party's primary but was reelected on the Liberal Party line alone, bringing along 'on his coat-tails' enough Liberal candidates for City Council to replace the Republicans as the Minority Party in city government. In 1977, after Mario Cuomo lost the Democratic nomination for mayor of New York to Ed Koch, the Liberal Party endorsed Cuomo, who proceeded to again lose narrowly in the general election.

The Liberal Party sometimes played the role of spoiler by being the possible cause of the defeat of Democrat Frank D. O'Connor in the race for governor in 1966 by naming Franklin Delano Roosevelt, Jr. as its candidate in the race against incumbent Republican Nelson Rockefeller. The Liberal Party played the role of spoiler even more in 1980 when they again decided to endorse long-serving liberal Republican senator Jacob Javits, instead of Democratic candidate Elizabeth Holtzman, despite the fact that Javits had recently been diagnosed with ALS and had lost in the Republican primary for United States Senator to his eventual successor, Al D'Amato. Later that year, in the 1980 general election for Senator, Javits took many Jewish votes and some liberal Republican votes away from Holtzman, as they both lost to the conservative D'Amato.

The Liberal Party declined in influence following the 1980 election. Its 1998 candidate for governor, Lieutenant Governor Betsy McCaughey Ross, received just 1.65% of the vote, with the party receiving criticism for its endorsement considering McCaughey's more conservative policies on healthcare in particular. The party endorsed Hillary Clinton's successful campaign for the United States Senate in 2000, but this did not revive its fortunes. After a very poor showing in the 2002 gubernatorial election when former Clinton administration Cabinet member Andrew Cuomo abandoned his campaign before the election but remained on the ballot as the Liberal candidate and received just 15,761 votes statewide, the party lost its automatic place on the ballot and ceased operations at its state offices.

Another hurdle to the efforts to reestablish the Liberal Party was the formation in mid-1998 of the Working Families Party, a party that enjoys, as the American Labor and Liberal Parties did in their prime, strong labor union support.

The Liberal Party also suffered allegations of corruption and of abandoning its liberal roots in favor of a system of patronage and nepotism – Harding relatives were given appointments in the Giuliani administration, and it was argued that it was a quid pro quo deal, since Giuliani is not generally considered a "liberal" by New York City standards. In 1999, The New York Observer called it an "ideologically bereft institution more interested in patronage than in policy." In 2009, Raymond Harding pleaded guilty to having accepted more than $800,000 in exchange for doing political favors for Alan G. Hevesi, a New York politician who was a frequent Liberal Party endorsee.

The Working Families Party became a new place for liberal or center-left voters to place their votes, and it did not help the Liberals that the Green Party, another left-wing organization, also expanded greatly at the same time. Around the same time that there was a surge in Working Families Party voting power, the Liberal Party failed to qualify for automatic ballot status, which robbed it of its inherent political power. The centrist campaigns of Tom Golisano boosted the Independence Party of New York into an automatic ballot line, due in large part to heavy campaigning against Republican George Pataki, which also helped siphon away potential Liberal Party votes.

In 2005, the New York Daily News reported that incumbent New York City Mayor Michael Bloomberg, then a liberal Republican who favors abortion rights and same-sex marriage, was seeking to revive the Liberal Party – and thereby run on a "Republican/Liberal" ticket – in an effort to win over Democratic voters in the overwhelmingly Democratic city.  Bloomberg was re-elected in 2005, but nothing came of these rumors of his campaign being used as a basis for a Liberal Party revival. In 2006, for the first time since the early 1940s, there was no Liberal candidate for Governor. Edward Culvert was the party's candidate for governor in 2010, but the party lacked the resources to muster the necessary petition with 15,000 valid signatures of registered voters to get him onto the ballot.

The Liberal Party's current chairman is Jack Olchin. Its executive director is Martin Hassner.  Prior to former New York City Parks Commissioner Henry Stern taking over as chairman in 2004, the Liberal Party's longtime leader was Raymond Harding (born Branko Hochwald; January 31, 1935 – August 9, 2012).

The Liberal Party cross-endorsed Republican candidate Bob Turner in the New York's 9th congressional district special election, 2011, marking one of the rare times the Liberal Party and the Conservative Party have agreed on a candidate other than an unopposed one.

Raymond Harding died August 9, 2012 in the Bronx of cancer, aged 77, depriving the Liberal Party of its best-known long-term figure.

While the Liberal Party still has a website, the last election in which it endorsed candidates, all on other party lines, was the New York City Council races in 2017.

Logo

The symbol of the New York Liberal Party is the Liberty Bell.

See also
Modern liberalism in the United States
Social liberalism
Contributions to liberal theory
Liberalism worldwide
List of liberal parties

References

Further reading
 Soyer, Daniel, "'Support the Fair Deal in the Nation; Abolish the Raw Deal in the City': The Liberal Party in 1949," New York History, 93 (Spring 2012), 147–81.
Soyer, Daniel. 2022. Left in the Center: The Liberal Party of New York and the Rise and Fall of American Social Democracy. Ithaca, NY: Cornell University Press. 
Armato, Michael A. 2022. “‘The One Who Spells It with a Capital L': Liberal Party Activism in the Hudson River Valley, 1948–1963.” The Hudson River Valley Review 38 (2): 44-62.

External links
Liberal Party
An article on the history of the Liberal Party of New York
Anthony Weiss, "Harding Indictment a Symbol of Liberal Party's Downfall", The Forward, April 24, 2009 (last retrieved on April 26, 2009) — includes a brief history of the party
2009 New York Times article on decline and fall of the party
Liberal Party declaration and platform, founding document (1944)

Liberalism in the United States
Political parties established in 1944
1944 establishments in New York (state)
Regional and state political parties in New York (state)
Political parties in New York (state)
Liberal parties in the United States
Social liberal parties in the United States
Progressive parties in the United States
Political parties in the United States